The 2009 Island Games in Åland was the 5th edition in which a women's football (soccer) tournament was played at the multi-games competition. It was contested by 10 teams.

Åland won the tournament for the second time.

Participants

Group phase

Group A

Group B

Final stage

Semi-finals

3rd place match

Final

Final rankings

No positional playoffs were played in this tournament. Final rankings from 5th to 10th are based on group positions.

Top goalscorers

8 goals
  Donna Shimmin

7 goals
  Jodie Botterill
  Hannah Salmén

6 goals
  Camilla Ronström
  Mathilda Mörn
  Eleanor Gawne

5 goals
  Ing-Marie Holmberg

4 goals
  Rebecca Björkvall

3 goals
  Marion Nilsson
  Sahra Karlsson
  Pilunnguaq Magnussen
  Annica Sjölund
  Daniela Haglund
  Sarah Engblom
  Gillian Christian
  Jade Burden
  Donna Harrison
  Jenna Stewart
  Sinead McLeod

See also
Men's Football at the 2009 Island Games

External links
Official 2009 website

2009
Women
Island